Battle of Breslau may refer to:

 Battle of Breslau (1757), part of the Third Silesian War, part of the Seven Years' War
 Siege of Breslau (1757), part of the Third Silesian War, part of the Seven Years' War
 Siege of Breslau (1760), part of the Third Silesian War, part of the Seven Years' War
 Siege of Breslau (1945), part of World War II
 Germany v Denmark (1937), a football match with the Breslau Eleven